Full-time equivalent (FTE), or whole time equivalent (WTE), is a unit of measurement that indicates the workload of an employed person (or student) in a way that makes workloads or class loads comparable across various contexts. FTE is often used to measure a worker's or student's involvement in a project, or to track cost reductions in an organization. An FTE of 1.0 is equivalent to a full-time worker or student, while an FTE of 0.5 signals half of a full work or school load.

In government

United States
According to the Federal government of the United States, FTE is defined by the Government Accountability Office (GAO) as the number of total hours worked divided by the maximum number of compensable hours in a full-time schedule as defined by law. For example, if the normal schedule for a quarter is defined as 411.25 hours ([35 hours per week * (52 weeks per year – 5 weeks' regulatory vacation)] / 4), then someone working 100 hours during that quarter represents 100/411.25 = 0.24 FTE. Two employees working in total 400 hours during that same quarterly period represent 0.97 FTE. Ex.

The U.S. Office of Management and Budget, or OMB, the President's budget office, will often place upper limits on the total number of FTE that a given agency may utilize each year. In the past, if agencies were given a ceiling on the actual number of employed workers, which was reported on a given day of the year, the agency could employ more than this number for much of the year. Then, as the reporting deadline approached, employees could be let go to reduce the total number to the authorized ceiling on the reporting date. Providing agencies with an FTE ceiling, which is calculated based on the total number of hours worked by all employees throughout the year, irrespective of the total numbers employed at any point in time, prevents agencies from using such a strategy.

Although the generally accepted human-resources meaning for the "E" in FTE is "equivalent", the term is often overloaded in colloquial usage to indicate a "direct, as opposed to contract, full-time employee".
The term WYE (work year equivalent) is often used instead of FTE when describing the contractor work.

In education 
Full-time equivalent students is one of the key metrics for measuring enrollment in colleges and universities. The measure is often annualized to cover the average annual full-time equivalent students and is designated by the acronym AAFTE.

Academics can increase their contribution by adopting a number of strategies:
(a) increase class size;
(b) teach new classes;
(c) supervise more projects;
(d) supervise more researchers.
The latter strategy has the advantage of contributing to another key metric in universities—creating new knowledge and in particular publishing papers in highly ranked academic journals. It's also linked to another key metric—research funding which is often required to attract researchers.

Australia
In Australia, the equivalent to FTE for students is EFTSL (Equivalent Full-Time Student Load).

Example
A professor teaches two undergraduate courses, supervises two undergraduate projects and supervises four researchers by thesis only (i.e. researchers do not take any courses). Each undergraduate course is worth one-tenth of all credits for the undergraduate program (i.e. 0.1 FTE). An undergraduate project is worth two-tenths of all credits for the undergraduate program (i.e. 0.2 FTE). A research thesis is worth all of the credits for the graduate program (i.e. 1 FTE). The professor's contribution is 29.4 FTEs:

To encourage more research some universities offer 2 FTEs or even 3 FTEs for each full-time researcher.

References

External links 
National Park Service Budget Glossary

Business terms
Education economics
Equivalent units
Metrics
Workplace